The Essential Eddie Money is a 2003 compilation album of hits from American rock singer Eddie Money, released as part of Sony BMG's Essential series. The album includes 15 tracks from Eddie Money's eight studio albums and one greatest hits album.

US track listing

Personnel 
 Eddie Money - Lead vocals, piano, keyboards, saxophone, synthesizer, backing vocals
 Angelo Arcuri - Backing vocals
 Becky West - Backing vocals
 Jenny Meltzer - Backing vocals
 Joe Pizzulo - Backing vocals
 Lynn Carter - Backing vocals
 Marc Tanner - Backing vocals
 Maureen McCormick - Backing vocals
 Ron Nevison - Backing vocals
 Sandy Sukhov - Backing vocals
 Tracy Harris - Backing vocals
 Bob Glaub, Don Cromwell, Don Schiff, John Pierce, Kenny Lee Lewis, Lonnie Turner, Ralph Carter, Randy Jackson, Robert "Pops" Popwell - Bass
 Arthur Barrow - Bass, keyboards
 Claude Gaudette - Drum programming, keyboards
 Carmine Appice, Charley Drayton, Gary Ferguson, Gene Pardue, Glenn Symmonds, Jack White, John Snyder - Drums
 Guitar – David Lewark, David Lindley, Greg Douglas*, John Corey, Marty Walsh, Steve Farris (2), Stevie Salas 
 Guitar, Backing Vocals – Chuck Kirkpatrick, Tom Girvin* 
 Guitar, Keyboards, Backing Vocals – Richie Zito 
 Guitar, Slide Guitar – John Nelson 
 Horn – Tom Scott 
 Keyboards – Brian Gary, Fred Webb*, Gary Chang, Jerry Deaton 
 Keyboards, Backing Vocals – Jesse Harms 
 Keyboards, Organ, Piano, Synthesizer, Vocals, Backing Vocals – Randy Nichols 
 Keyboards, Percussion, Backing Vocals – Curt Cuomo 
 Keyboards, Synthesizer – Kim Bullard 
 Piano – Nicky Hopkins 
 Saxophone – Boney James, Danny Hall, Paul Hanson 
 Vocals [2nd Vocal] – Jo Baker (tracks: 2) 
 Vocals [Duet] – Ronnie Spector (tracks: 10) 
 Vocals, Backing Vocals – Tommy Funderburk

Production
 Jeff Magid – Compilation producer
 Producer [Original recordings produced by] – Bruce Botnick, Chris Lord-Alge, Curt Cuomo, Eddie Money, Monty Byrom, Randy D. Jackson*, Richie Zito, Ron Nevison, Tom Dowd

Release history

References

Eddie Money compilation albums
2003 greatest hits albums
Columbia Records compilation albums